Franz Joseph Martin, Freiherr von Albini auf Dürrenried  (14 May 1748 – 8 January 1816) was a German judge and statesman, noted for organising the defence of German states against the French Revolution.

Life
Born 1748 in St. Goar, Germany, he served in the Würzburg Court and Government from 1770, the Court of Appeal in Wetzlar from 1775, and became a clerk to the Holy Roman Empire in Vienna 1787.  In 1790 he became Electoral Chancellor and Minister, and headed the last Imperial election in 1792. When the armies of Revolutionary France began making incursions into Germany in 1794 he represented the general arming of the people against the French occupation. He organised the defensive Landsturm (Militia) of Mainz and surroundings. Albini was a representative at the Congress of Rastatt 1797. On the re-opening of hostilities in 1799 he was given the rank of Feldzeugmeister in the Austrian Army and appointed to command a 20,000-man corps of German volunteers raised on the right bank of the Rhine under Graf Sztaray. In this capacity he attacked the French under Louis Baraguey d'Hilliers in September and re-captured Frankfurt-am-Main, before threatening the French garrison of Mainz. During Claude Lecourbe's offensive of 16 November he again threatened the French left wing on the right bank of the Neckar.

In 1806 he was made Governor of Regensburg, and for a short period Commissioner of Frankfurt 19–25 September 1806. Then he was Chairman of the Council of Ministers of Frankfurt 10 October 1806 - December 1810. In the Confederation of the Rhine he was made Minister of the Grand Duchy of Frankfurt 1810. Albini was a member of the Conference of Ministers administrating Frankfurt 30 September - 23 December 1813, then Presidential Envoy to the Federal Parliament of the German Confederation in Frankfurt 5 October - 16 December 1815. He died in 1816 in Dieburg.

References

Gollwitzer, Heinz, "Albini, Franz Josef Martin Freiherr von", in: Neue Deutsche Biographie 1 (1953)

1748 births
1816 deaths
Counts of Germany
German diplomats
People from Rhein-Hunsrück-Kreis
Politicians from Frankfurt